Zimatlán District is located in the west of the Valles Centrales Region of the State of Oaxaca, Mexico.

Municipalities

The district includes the following municipalities:
 
Ayoquezco de Aldama
Ciénega de Zimatlán
Magdalena Mixtepec
San Antonino El Alto
San Bernardo Mixtepec
San Miguel Mixtepec
San Pablo Huixtepec
Santa Ana Tlapacoyan
Santa Catarina Quiané
Santa Cruz Mixtepec
Santa Gertrudis
Santa Inés Yatzeche
Zimatlán de Alvarez

References

Districts of Oaxaca
Valles Centrales de Oaxaca